David James Eringa (born 30 July 1971 in Brentwood, Essex) is an English record producer, sound and mix engineer.

Biography 
He has a career long association with the Manic Street Preachers, he was on tea making duties on their first single "Motown Junk". He played keyboards on "Generation Terrorists", producing & mixing "Gold Against The Soul", playing keyboards live with the band 1993–94, producing & mixing two tracks on "Everything Must Go" ("Australia" & "No Surface All Feeling"), producing & mixing half of "This Is My Truth, Tell Me Yours" (including No. 1 single "If You Tolerate This Your Children Will Be Next"), producing & mixing the first No. 1 of the millennium ("Masses Against The Classes"), producing & mixing "Know Your Enemy", & producing "Send Away The Tigers".

He also has a long association with Idlewild producing & mixing "100 Broken Windows", "The Remote Part" & "Make Another World", as well as contributing to "Warnings & Promises" and more recently "Post Electric Blues". 

In 2014, he produced Wilko Johnson & Roger Daltrey's gold-selling album Going Back Home, which led to him producing The Who & working with Daltrey on a solo album.

Production credits
Eringa has worked and played on albums by artists including Manic Street Preachers, Idlewild, Wilko Johnson and Roger Daltrey, The Who, Gyroscope, BB Brunes, Calogero, Kylie Minogue, Tom Jones, 3 Colours Red, South and Nine Black Alps. 
 1993 Manic Street Preachers  – Gold Against the Soul
 1994 These Animal Men  – Too Sussed
 1995 Headswim  – Flood
 1996 Manic Street Preachers  – Everything Must Go
 1996 Northern Uproar  – Northern Uproar
 1996 Lodestar  – Lodestar
 1998 Manic Street Preachers  – This Is My Truth Tell Me Yours
 1998 Moke (British band)  – Superdrag
 1999 3 Colours Red  – Revolt
 1999 Toploader  –  Onka's Big Moka  
 2000 Idlewild  – 100 Broken Windows
 2001 Lowgold  – Just Backward of Square
 2001 Manic Street Preachers  – Know Your Enemy
 2002 Idlewild  – The Remote Part
 2002 Kylie Minogue  – Confide in Me
 2003 South  – With the Tides
 2005 Ocean Colour Scene – A Hyperactive Workout for the Flying Squad
 2005 Belarus – Communicate
 2006 Starky – Starky
 2006 Milburn – Well Well Well
 2006 James Dean Bradfield  – The Great Western
 2007 Kubichek!  – Not Enough Night
 2007 Manic Street Preachers  – Send Away the Tigers
 2007 Gyroscope – "Breed Obsession"
 2007 Idlewild  – Make Another World
 2007 The Dykeenies  – Nothing Means Everything
 2009 The Xcerts – In The Cold Wind We Smile
 2009 The Answering Machine – Another City, Another Sorry
 2009 Telegraphs – We Were Ghosts
 2009 Manic Street Preachers  – Journal for Plague Lovers  (Tracks 4,5 & 8)
 2009 Idlewild  – Post Electric Blues
 2009 Nine Black Alps  – Locked out from the Inside
 2009 Zico Chain  –  These Birds Will Kill Us All
 2009 The Attika State  –  Measures
 2010 Manic Street Preachers  – Postcards From a Young Man
 2011 Failsafe  – Routines
 2012 BB Brunes - Long Courier
 2012 Big City- The Way the Trees Are
2012 Sound Of Guns - Angels and Enemies
 2013 Manic Street Preachers  – Rewind the Film
 2014 Calogero - Les feux d'artifice
 2014 Wilko Johnson and Roger Daltrey – Going Back Home
 2015 The Proclaimers - Let's Hear It For The Dogs
 2016 Beaty Heart - Till The Tomb
 2018 Manic Street Preachers - Resistance is Futile
 2018 The Proclaimers - Angry Cyclist
 2018 Roger Daltrey - As Long I Have You
 2021 Manic Street Preachers  – The Ultra Vivid Lament

References

External links
Official website
[ Allmusic.com - Complete production credits]
Dave Eringa interview on BBC Wales

Living people
1971 births
English record producers
English audio engineers
Alternative rock keyboardists
People from Brentwood, Essex